Yulia Vladimirovna Belomestnykh (born 17 March 1996) is a Russian bobsledder. She competed in the two-woman event at the 2018 Winter Olympics.

References

External links
 

1996 births
Living people
Russian female bobsledders
Olympic bobsledders of Russia
Bobsledders at the 2018 Winter Olympics
Bobsledders at the 2022 Winter Olympics
Place of birth missing (living people)